A print-disabled person is "a person who cannot effectively read print because of a visual, physical, perceptual, developmental, cognitive, or learning disability". A print disability prevents a person from gaining information from printed material in the standard way, and requires them to utilize alternative methods to access that information. Print disabilities include visual impairments, learning disabilities, or physical disabilities that impede the ability to manipulate a book. The term was coined by George Kerscher, a pioneer in digital talking books. DAISY is used by libraries as a means of making complex books accessible via audio.

A conference organised by the World Intellectual Property Organization (WIPO) in Marrakesh, Morocco, in June 2013 adopted a special treaty called "A Treaty to Facilitate Access to Published Works by Visually Impaired Persons and Persons with Print Disabilities" (briefly Marrakesh VIP Treaty).

The Marrakesh Treaty represents an important change in how law makers balance the demands of copyright owners against the interests of people with disabilities in particular, and a potential point of inflection in global copyright politics more generally.

Initiatives 

 The Accessible Books Consortium (ABC), launched in 2014, was conceived as "one possible initiative, among others, to concretely achieve the goals of the Marrakesh Treaty ". ABC aims to increase the number of books worldwide in accessible formats – such as braille, audio and large print – and to make them available to people who are blind, have low vision or are otherwise print disabled.

References

Accessibility
Reading (process)